Collybistin is a protein identified as a regulator of the  localization of gephyrin, inducing the formation of submembrane gephyrin aggregates that accumulate glycine and GABA receptors. In 2000 it was identified as a gephyrin binding partner, and an important determinant of inhibitory postsynaptic membrane formation and plasticity. Gephyrin and collybistin are recruited to developing postsynaptic membranes of inhibitory synapses by the trans-synaptic adhesion molecule neuroligin-2, where they provide the scaffold for the clustering of inhibitory postsynaptic receptors to form a functioning inhibitory synapse.

References 

GTP-binding protein regulators